Diego Terrazas (born February 23, 1987 in Santa Cruz de la Sierra) is a Bolivian footballer. He currently plays as a midfielder for the Liga de Fútbol Profesional Boliviano side Real Potosí.

Club career
Terrazas  joined Oriente B in 2006 at the age of 19, and played 29 games for the team his first year.  
Following the 2009 season, Terrazas was called by Pablo Sánchez to face the Clausura and Playoff Tournament. In 2010, he scored his 2nd goal in the opening match against Real Mamore.

External links
 
 
  Terrazas se gana el puesto
 Terrazas reemplazara a Suarez

1987 births
Living people
Sportspeople from Santa Cruz de la Sierra
Bolivian footballers
Association football midfielders
Oriente Petrolero players